Laughter is the fourth EP released by Tiny Vipers. It is the first major solo album released by Tiny Vipers in eight years. Laughter was created by Jesy Fortino while she was at the University of Washington studying civil engineering. It is a departure from previous major solo albums in that it relies mostly on synths and keyboards.

Track listing
All songs written by Jesy Fortino.
 "Boarding Charon's Boat" – 2:19
 "Crossing the River of Yourself" – 6:25
 "Living on a Curve" – 9:46
 "K.I.S.S." – 4:13
 "The Summing of Moments" - 3:53
 "Laughter" - 14:22

References

2017 albums
Tiny Vipers albums
Ba Da Bing Records albums